I'm Gonna Git You Sucka is a 1988 American blaxploitation parody film written, directed by, and starring Keenen Ivory Wayans in his directorial debut. Featured in the film are several noteworthy African-American actors who were part of the genre of blaxploitation: Jim Brown, Bernie Casey, Antonio Fargas, and Isaac Hayes. Other actors in the film are Kadeem Hardison, Ja'net Dubois, John Witherspoon, Damon Wayans, Clarence Williams III, and Chris Rock. The film is also the film debut of comedian Robin Harris, who appears as a bartender, and of brothers Shawn and Marlon Wayans.

The film's main villain, "Mr. Big," was played by John Vernon.

Plot
When Soldier Jack Spade learns that his brother Junebug overdosed on gold chains and died, he returns to Any Ghetto, U.S.A. As he surveys the old neighborhood, Jack notices the impact that gold chains have had on his neighborhood and feels that not only should his brother's death be made right, but the entire neighborhood as well. He vows to destroy Mr. Big, the neighborhood chain lord responsible for the epidemic that claimed Junebug's life. Jack asks for the aid of his childhood idol and local hero John Slade in planning the demise of Mr. Big's empire. Together, they form a team including Kung Fu Joe, Flyguy, Slammer, and Hammer. With the help of his crew, Jack sets out to take down Mr. Big and the gold trade in the streets.

Cast

Background
The film was written and directed by first-time director Keenan Ivory Wayans. The inspiration behind the film came from Wayans, who is a fan of blaxploitation films, and his childhood spent growing up watching these films as they made up the majority of black films made during the 1960s and 1970s. Sitting with friends and making fun of the genre struck the idea for the film in Wayans. Before making I’m Gonna Git You Sucka, Wayans spent five years earning credentials for films such as Hollywood Shuffle and Eddie Murphy Raw. Eddie Murphy suggested the concept of a blaxploitation parody and its title. Once Wayans earned enough credibility to have his film picked up by a studio and a budget of $3 million, Wayans filmed his debut feature film in 32 days. It grossed a total of $3 million in the box office in the first month of the film's release.

Critical reception 
I'm Gonna Git You Sucka has a rating of 62% on Rotten Tomatoes from 29 reviews, the critical consensus on the website saying that the film "puts a satirical spin on '70s nostalgia with a comedy whose somewhat scattershot laughs are often offset by pure energetic silliness."

The film opened with rave responses from the black community. African-American audience members were thrilled to attend the screening of a movie filled with black actors about a black film genre. I’m Gonna Git You Sucka received critical receptions that were wide-ranging and numerous in viewpoint. To the urban public, the parody film perfectly captured the era of blaxploitation films in the 1960s and 1970s. Critics also noted Wayans’ ability to satirically capture the era of the “Buck” in blaxploitation film: the white man's notion of the all-powerful brutal black man.

In her analysis of the film, Harriet Margolis writes that this is not because “[Jack] consciously chooses to reject his mother’s values as that he wants to establish his own based on the macho heroic values he learned during the heyday of blaxploitation films."

Robert Sklar wrote “The [blaxploitation film] movement quickly developed into a phenomenon not of an African-American audience but of a specific subgroup, a segment of a segment: young urban males,” so often the perspective and narratives of young black women were left out or included as the background in many of these films during the 1970s.

Critics of the film argued that the film not only failed at producing humor in its use of black stereotypes, but generally was not funny. Chicago Sun-Times film critic Roger Ebert wrote I’m Gonna Git You Sucka is "a comedy that feeds off the blaxploitation movie, and although, like all good satires, it is cheerfully willing to be offensive, it is almost completely incapable of being funny." There was also a concern about the perception of the film by the white movie going audience. The film's villain, Mr. Big, is not only a white man, but a white man responsible for the deterioration of an inner city black community.

Television pilot
On December 15, 1990, the hour-long television pilot titled Hammer, Slammer, & Slade was shown on ABC-TV. It was directed by Michael Schultz.

Isaac Hayes (Hammer), Jim Brown (Slammer), and Bernie Casey (Slade) continued in their parts from the movie I'm Gonna Git You Sucka. Also returning were Ja'net Dubois and Steve James. Although Keenen Ivory Wayans wrote the pilot, and he served as the executive producer, he did not appear in this pilot. Instead, the character of Jack Spade was portrayed by Eriq La Salle. Fast-talking Lennie, played by Damon Wayans in the film, was played by Bentley Kyle Evans, while his sidekick Willie, played by Kadeem Hardison in the film, was played by a then-unknown Martin Lawrence.

Hammer, Slammer, & Slade was not sold to any TV network, but it was shown several times in syndication.

Home media
In 2001, I'm Gonna Git You Sucka was released on DVD and in 2010, it was digitized in High Definition (1080i) and released on MGM HD.

See also
 Hollywood Shuffle (1987)
 Black Dynamite (2009)

References

External links 
 
 
 
 

1988 films
1980s action comedy films
1980s black comedy films
1980s parody films
1988 directorial debut films
1988 comedy films
1980s American films
American action comedy films
American black comedy films
American parody films
1980s English-language films
African-American comedy films
Blaxploitation films
Films set in Indiana
American films about revenge
Metro-Goldwyn-Mayer films
United Artists films
Films directed by Keenen Ivory Wayans
Films scored by David Michael Frank
African-American films
American vigilante films
American exploitation films